Grave Encounters is a 2011 Canadian found footage supernatural horror film written, directed and edited by the Vicious Brothers. It stars Sean Rogerson, Ashleigh Gryzko, Merwin Mondesir, Mackenzie Gray, and Juan Riedinger as the crew of a paranormal reality television program who lock themselves in a supposedly haunted psychiatric hospital in search of evidence of paranormal activity, as they shoot what ends up becoming their final episode.

Grave Encounters premiered on April 22, 2011, at the Tribeca Film Festival. Prior to its premiere, its trailer went viral online, generating over 30 million views. The film had a limited theatrical run in select theaters in the United States, and was released on video-on-demand on August 25, 2011. Two months prior, the film had its Italian premiere via distributor Eagle Pictures under the title ESP Fenomeni Paranormali.

The film received mixed reviews, was a box office success, spawned a sequel in 2012, and has attained a cult following since its release.

Plot
Jerry Hartfield is the producer of Grave Encounters, a paranormal reality television program directed by ghost hunter Lance Preston. Hartfield explains that the show was cancelled after five episodes following the disappearance of its crew, and presents raw scenes from recovered footage of the sixth and final episode. The Grave Encounters crew consists of Lance, occult specialist Sasha Parker, surveillance operator Matt White, cameraman T.C. Gibson, and fake medium Houston Grey. The crew is invited to examine the abandoned Collingwood Psychiatric Hospital, where unexplained phenomena have been reported for years. Kenny, the hospital's caretaker, takes the crew on a day tour and informs them of the hospital's history, particularly of a doctor named Arthur Friedkin, who performed unethical experiments and lobotomies on the hospital's patients before being killed by them.

The crew lock themselves inside the hospital for the night and begin their investigation, setting up camp near the main entrance and positioning static cameras throughout the building. No paranormal activity seems to occur within the first few hours until T.C. captures a door slamming behind him. The crew attempts to establish contact with any entities that might be in the hospital; they soon hear unexplained sounds, and Sasha's hair appears to be lifted into the air by an unseen force. They return downstairs to pack in preparation for Kenny's return. Matt sets out alone to retrieve the static cameras. Before Matt can retrieve the last camera, a loud banging noise grabs Matt's attention and he walks off to investigate it.

When neither Matt nor Kenny returns, the crew forces the front doors open but discover that it leads to another hallway. They aimlessly walk the hallways and realize that despite their clocks saying it's dawn, it is still dark outside. The crew return to the lobby and sleep but are awoken when the construction light they set up falls forward and breaks. T.C. tells Lance that there is a fire escape on the roof and they head off to find a stairwell with rooftop access. They are successful but find that the stairs are blocked off by a randomly built wall blocking their escape.

They decide to back track and while looking at a map on the wall, the arrows on their compass spin in random directions. The group hear what sounds like Matt screaming and run through the halls hoping to find him. 
Once they find the room where they heard Matt's screams, they encounter a metal bed frame that levitates into the air and they run in terror. The crew stops to rest and when they wake up, they find the word "HELLO" scratched onto Sasha's back. They once again go looking for Matt after hearing his voice on the walkie-talkie. The group comes across a woman in a hospital gown and when they catch up with her, her face distorts grotesquely. They flee from the entity in fear, and Houston is separated from the other crew members. Houston wanders the halls in the darkness and is then lifted into the air and choked before a bright light bursts from the end of the hallway which sends Houston flying and kills him. After hiding in a room for several hours, Lance, Sasha, and T.C. discover that they have been fitted with hospital identification bracelets bearing their names. The trio roam the halls again and an arm smashes through the window on a door and grabs Sasha. Lance frees her and they run down the hallways. While Lance comforts Sasha, T.C. yells at them to come into a room which Matt is sitting in. Matt, wearing a hospital gown and now insane, mumbles incoherently and claims that they can leave the building once they are "better".

The four rest inside a room and when they wake up, several hands are reaching through the ceiling and walls. The group flee into a room full of bathtubs and find Matt staring down at a bathtub full of blood. T.C. attempts to pull Matt away from the tub, but a figure emerges from the blood and drags T.C. into it. Sasha and Lance tip the tub over but T.C. is not inside it which causes Sasha and Matt to become hysterical. Lance finds an elevator but struggles to pull the doors open. He leaves Sasha and Matt behind to look for something to try open the doors. Lance yanks a rod off of a hospital cart and notices a bloody severed tongue in the corner of the room. Lance then sees a ghostly figure huddled up in the corner of the ceiling which chases after him. Lance makes it back to Sasha and Matt and successfully tries opening the elevator doors. He hears the figure making its way to them, so Lance and Sasha keep the entity at bay by keeping the door closed. While the two are busy, Matt leans forward and plunges several feet down the elevator shaft, killing himself.

Lance and Sasha enter the tunnels beneath the building in search of an exit. Sasha falls ill and begins to cough up blood violently.  The two stop to sleep and Sasha is abducted by a mist. Lance, now all by himself, wanders the tunnels for several hours. An increasingly unstable Lance wanders the tunnels alone and feeds on live rats to survive. Lance passes out and after waking up, finds a door leading into Friedkin's operating room, which contains evidence of occult rituals and graphic photos of his operations. He sees apparitions of Friedkin and several nurses, and is dragged away from his camera. A lobotomized Lance records himself proclaiming that he is cured and allowed to leave.

Cast

Production
Grave Encounters was produced in collaboration with American Express, Digital Interference, Twin Engine Films and Darclight.

Development

The film was written and directed by the Vicious Brothers, Colin Minihan and Stuart Ortiz. The pair sought to create a project in the horror genre, and in order to maintain a low budget, decided to utilise "the mockumentary format" at a time when found-footage horror films such as 2007's Paranormal Activity were achieving commercial success. According to Minihan, he and Ortiz wondered, "why has no one made a fucking found-footage film out of these ghost-hunting shows?"

Minihan and Ortiz wrote a script for the film roughly 85 pages in length, though they allowed the members of the cast to improvise during filming.

Filming
Grave Encounters was filmed in Riverview Hospital, a mental institute in Coquitlam, British Columbia; the hospital has served as a location for a number of other television and film productions.

Visual effects
A number of visual effects in the film were accomplished using computer-generated imagery (CGI). One sequence, in which a character is thrown across a room, was initially filmed as a practical effect using a stunt performer. Upon reviewing the footage of the stunt performer being "thrown", Minihan and Ortiz were dissatisfied with the result; they then asked the performer to run, jump, and fall to the ground several times, and completed the final effect in post-production.

Release
A teaser trailer for the film was first uploaded to YouTube in December 2010. The trailer went viral, garnering over 1.5 million views in three months. The film's distribution rights were acquired by Tribeca Film.

Grave Encounters premiered on April 22, 2011, at the Tribeca Film Festival. It had its Italian premiere on June 1, 2011, via distributor Eagle Pictures, under the title ESP Fenomeni Paranormali. The film was released in the United States on August 25, 2011 in select theaters using the Eventful Demand It and video on demand via Comcast.

Critical reception
On Metacritic, which assigns a normalized rating to reviews, the film has a weighted average score of 33 out of 100, based on four reviews, indicating "generally unfavorable reviews".

In her review of the film for The New York Times, Jeannette Catsoulis wrote: "Following in the stampeding footsteps of The Blair Witch Project and the Paranormal Activity franchise, the filmmakers seem unaware that they're beating a dead horse." Mike Hale, also writing for The New York Times, felt that the film's "claustrophobic, infrared images, supposedly taken from the tapes of a TV crew that spent the night in a mental hospital, offer some real scares, though the movie starts to feel long and repetitious before its 92 minutes are over." Nick Schager of Slant Magazine gave the film a score of one-and-a-half out of four stars, writing that it "can't even pretend to be anything other than hopelessly derivative." Aaron Hillis, in a negative review of the film for The Village Voice, concluded: "Windows quietly open, wheelchairs roll, faces contort into cheesy CGI ghouls, and 'digital artifacts' cover up the low-budget seams. But true terror needs at least some authenticity. That's perhaps too much to ask of a faked movie about a faked reality show that still can't scare up a fresh idea."

Conversely, Jon Reiss of the New York Press called Grave Encounters the "scariest film since The Ring". Dennis Harvey, in his review of the film for Variety, wrote that its "creepiness factor is sufficient to rate this a notch above genre average". Voxs Dylan Scott recommended the film, writing that it "effectively spoof[s] those ghost hunter shows that were briefly a hot trend, while still building toward a genuinely suspenseful second half." Meagan Navarro, in a positive review of the film for Bloody Disgusting, wrote that "the filmmakers toss subtlety out the window in favor of fun, in your face chills that stick their landing." Felicity Burton of Scream magazine wrote that, had the film "kept to the subtle scares, and dumped the CGI ghosts, it would have been a lot better", but concluded: "If you still haven't had your fill of found footage films, it's definitely worth a watch."

Sequels
A sequel titled Grave Encounters 2, written by the Vicious Brothers and directed by John Poliquin, was released on October 2, 2012. In May 2015, the Vicious Brothers announced plans for a third installment, entitled Grave Encounters 3: The Beginning, but was quickly cancelled following the second film's failure to generate public interest.

See also
 Gonjiam: Haunted Asylum, a 2018 South Korean film with a similar premise
 List of ghost films

References

External links

2011 films
2011 horror films
Canadian supernatural horror films
Canadian ghost films
English-language Canadian films
2010s supernatural horror films
Found footage films
Films about Satanism
Films set in psychiatric hospitals
Films set in 2003
2010s English-language films
2010s Canadian films